Crosby Garrett was a railway station which
served the village of Crosby Garrett in Cumbria, England. The station was built by the Midland Railway and opened in 1876. It was closed by the British Transport Commission as an economy measure in 1952.

History

The station platforms were set into the cutting needing substantial protective retaining walls, as can be seen in the adjacent photographs. The station master's house still exists as a private dwelling near the overbridge, whilst the overgrown platforms have also survived and can be seen from passing trains.

The driver, aware that another train was approaching on this line, followed laid down procedures and was able to warn the oncoming English, Welsh and Scottish Railway (EW&SR) coal train by using a warning light and placing a track detonator. The freight train driver slowed his train but was not able to prevent it running into the derailed passenger train, which was consequently pushed back about  into the tunnel. The train crew required hospital treatment but none of the 22 passengers were injured. The passengers were taken to the nearby village and were assisted by the villagers, resulting in a donation being made to the community by Northern Spirit.

References
Notes

Sources

External links
 Crosby Garrett station
 Flickr

Disused railway stations in Cumbria
Former Midland Railway stations
Railway stations in Great Britain opened in 1876
Railway stations in Great Britain closed in 1952